George Augustus Bicknell (February 6, 1815 – April 11, 1891) was an American lawyer and politician who served two terms as a U.S. Representative from Indiana from 1877 to 1881.

Early life and career 
Born in Philadelphia, Pennsylvania, Bicknell graduated from the University of Pennsylvania in 1831. He completed the study of law at Yale Law School. He was admitted to the bar in 1836 and commenced practice in New York City before moving to Lexington, Indiana, in 1846.

Family 
He married Elizabeth Haskins Richards (November 13, 1816 - July 1, 1909), daughter of Jesse and Sarah Haskins Richards of Batsto, New Jersey.(1) They had at least two sons (Jesse Richards Bicknell and Admiral George Augustus Bicknell, III) and two daughters (Martha Haskins Richards Bicknell Mahon and Emma Valeria Pintard Bicknell Love). (2)

Legal and teaching career 
Bicknell was elected prosecuting attorney of Scott County in 1848 and then circuit prosecutor in 1850. He moved to New Albany in 1851. He served as judge of the second judicial circuit of Indiana 1852-1876, and was also a professor of law at Indiana University 1861-1870.

Congress 
Bicknell was elected as a Democrat to the Forty-fifth and Forty-sixth Congresses (March 4, 1877 – March 3, 1881). He was an unsuccessful candidate for renomination in 1880.

Later career and death 
He was appointed commissioner of appeals in the supreme court of Indiana in 1881, the office which he held until the completion of its work in 1885, after which he resumed the practice of law.

Bicknell was elected judge of the circuit court of Indiana in 1889 and held that office until his death, April 11, 1891, in New Albany, Indiana. He was interred in Fairview Cemetery.

References

(1)  "A Genealogical History of the DuPuy Family", Charles Meredith DuPuy; J.B.Lippincott Co., Philadelphia, PA; 1910; pg. 82

(2)   FindAGrave.com;  Find A Grave Memorial# 103540595

1815 births
1891 deaths
University of Pennsylvania alumni
Politicians from Philadelphia
New York (state) lawyers
Indiana lawyers
Indiana University faculty
Yale Law School alumni
Democratic Party members of the United States House of Representatives from Indiana
Indiana state court judges
19th-century American politicians
19th-century American judges
19th-century American lawyers